Minding the Store is a 2005 American reality television show which aired on TBS. It stars comedian Pauly Shore, who in the show made efforts to revitalize his acting career and run the family business, The Comedy Store.

Content
The show is a reality television series in which comedian Pauly Shore runs The Comedy Store, the comedy club run by his family. Features of the series include him attempting to add new features to the club, such as food service. Shore's parents, Mitzi Shore and Sammy Shore, also make appearances. Shore himself said of the series that he found it unusual since it was the first work in which he was required to play a straight man role.

Shore pledged to send a dollar to anyone who viewed the show's first episode and failed to laugh.

Critical reception
Ted Cox of the Arlington Heights, Illinois Daily Herald gave the show a mostly positive review. Although he thought the segments focused more on Shore's personal life than the comedy club were "dull", he also thought that Shore showed "some humility", and thought that setting the show in a comedy club added several opportunities for humor.

References

TBS (American TV channel) original programming
2005 American television series debuts
2005 American television series endings
2000s American reality television series